Exodus is an album by American jazz trombonist, composer and arranger Slide Hampton which was recorded in Paris in 1962 and first released on the French Philips label in 1964.

Reception

Allmusic stated "Trombonist Slide Hampton, just 30 years old at the time of this octet session in Paris, had already developed into a forward-thinking arranger. ...fans of the trombone will definitely want to acquire this".

Track listing 
 "Exodus" (Ernest Gold) - 3:48
 "Star Eyes" (Gene de Paul, Don Raye) - 8:45
 "Confirmation" (Charlie Parker) - 12:21
 "Moment's Notice" (John Coltrane) - 3:29
 "I'll Take Romance" (Oscar Hammerstein II, Ben Oakland) - 3:40
 "I Remember Clifford" (Benny Golson) - 5:10
 "Straight, No Chaser" (Thelonious Monk) - 8:37

Personnel 
Slide Hampton - trombone, arranger
Nat Pavone, Richard Williams - trumpet
Benny Jacobs-El - trombone
George Coleman - tenor saxophone
Jay Cameron - baritone saxophone
Butch Warren - bass
Vinnie Ruggiero - drums

References 

Slide Hampton albums
1964 albums
Philips Records albums